Nocardiopsis ganjiahuensis  is a bacterium from the genus of Nocardiopsis which has been isolated from soil from the Ganjiahu Natural Reserve from the Xinjiang Province in China.

References

External links
Type strain of Nocardiopsis ganjiahuensis at BacDive -  the Bacterial Diversity Metadatabase	

Actinomycetales
Bacteria described in 2008